Olin Douglas Browne (born May 22, 1959) is an American professional golfer who played on the PGA Tour and now plays on the PGA Tour Champions.

Browne was born in Washington, D.C. He graduated from Holderness School in Plymouth, N.H. in 1977. He then went on to Occidental College in 1981. He turned professional in 1984. He lives in Hobe Sound, Florida. He has featured in the top 50 of the Official World Golf Ranking.

Browne won three times on the PGA Tour. On August 8, 2007, Browne was named one of the assistant captains for the 2008 United States Ryder Cup team.

At the 1998 Masters Tournament, Browne and Scott Simpson both carded a quadruple bogey on the opening hole of the first round - the worst start in the history of the tournament.

Browne qualified for the 2005 U.S. Open at Pinehurst by shooting a final round 59 in the qualifying tournament. He shared the lead the first two days of the Open, dropping into a tie for second going into the final day. He shot a final round 80 to drop to T-23rd.

Browne played in his first Champions Tour event in 2009 at The Principal Charity Classic, where he shared the first round lead but struggled on the weekend. He captured his first Champions Tour victory at the 2011 U.S. Senior Open, making his maiden win on tour a senior major championship. Browne held off the challenge of Mark O'Meara on Sunday to prevail by three strokes and become only the fifth player in professional golf history to win on the Nationwide Tour, the PGA Tour and the Champions Tour.

Browne has worked as an analyst for ESPN as on-course reporter during the network's golf telecasts.

He is currently a member of Wolferts Roost Country Club in Albany, New York. Browne has a son, Olin Jr., who is also a professional golfer.

Professional wins (9)

PGA Tour wins (3)

PGA Tour playoff record (1–0)

Nike Tour wins (4)

Nike Tour playoff record (0–1)

Other wins (1)

Other playoff record (1–0)

PGA Tour Champions wins (2)

*Note: The 2015 Greater Gwinnett Championship was shortened to 36 holes due to rain.

PGA Tour Champions playoff record (0–2)

Results in major championships

Note: Browne never played in The Open Championship.

CUT = missed the half-way cut
"T" = tied

Summary

Most consecutive cuts made – 4 (1994 U.S. Open – 1997 PGA)
Longest streak of top-10s – 1

Results in The Players Championship

CUT = missed the halfway cut
"T" indicates a tie for a place

Results in World Golf Championships

1Cancelled due to 9/11

QF, R16, R32, R64 = Round in which player lost in match play
"T" = Tied
NT = No tournament

Senior major championships

Wins (1)

Senior results timeline
Results not in chronological order before 2022.

CUT = missed the halfway cut
"T" indicates a tie for a place
NT = No tournament due to COVID-19 pandemic

See also
1991 Ben Hogan Tour graduates
1993 Nike Tour graduates
1995 PGA Tour Qualifying School graduates
List of golfers with most Web.com Tour wins

References

External links

American male golfers
PGA Tour golfers
PGA Tour Champions golfers
Winners of senior major golf championships
Korn Ferry Tour graduates
Golfers from Washington, D.C.
Occidental College alumni
St. Albans School (Washington, D.C.) alumni
Holderness School alumni
People from Hobe Sound, Florida
1959 births
Living people